Roldano Simeoni (born in Civitavecchia on 21 December 1948) is a retired water polo player from Italy, who competed in three consecutive Summer Olympics for his native country, starting in 1972.

Simeoni was a member of the Men's National Team, that claimed the silver medal at the Montréal Olympics. During his career he was affiliated with Società Nuoto e Canottaggio Civitavecchia and Pro Recco.

See also
 List of Olympic medalists in water polo (men)
 List of world champions in men's water polo
 List of World Aquatics Championships medalists in water polo

External links
 

1948 births
Living people
Italian male water polo players
People from Civitavecchia
Water polo players at the 1972 Summer Olympics
Water polo players at the 1976 Summer Olympics
Water polo players at the 1980 Summer Olympics
Olympic silver medalists for Italy in water polo
Medalists at the 1976 Summer Olympics
Sportspeople from the Metropolitan City of Rome Capital